Ilie Babinciuc (born 6 December 1985) is a tennis player from Moldova. He was part of the Moldova Davis Cup team for two ties in 2004.

Davis Cup

Singles performances (1–0)

Doubles performances (2-0)

References

External links
 
 
 

Living people
1985 births
Moldovan male tennis players
21st-century Moldovan people